John Di Domenico (born November 4, 1962) is an American actor, comedian and writer, best known for his award-winning impersonation of Donald Trump. He has portrayed Donald Trump many times on television, movies and web series, which includes Meet the Spartans, Conan, Red Eye, You Got Trumped and others.

Early life and education
Di Domenico was born in Ambler, Pennsylvania to John and Selena Di Domenico. When he was a teenager, he started performing with a community theatre group which worked out of the Ambler Theatre and Opera house. Di Domenico attended East Stroudsburg University in the Pocono Mountains of Pennsylvania, majoring in Speech Communications. He then transferred to Temple University in Philadelphia. After he graduated from Temple with a BA in Speech Communications Di Domenico joined a Philadelphia advertising agency as a copywriter.

Career
He began his acting career in the late 1980s in Philadelphia. He first joined SKITZOID Comedy Troupe and started performing and touring nationally with the company. He became the head writer and artistic director. In September 1989 Di Domenico auditioned for and landed the role of Joey Vitale in the hit off-Broadway interactive improvisational show "Tony n' Tina's Wedding." While working in New York John became a member of Some Assembly Required, one of the city's finest improvisation companies.

Di Domenico has portrayed Donald Trump many times on Conan, Fox News Redeye and the Netflix original series Chelsea. Di Domenico won ABC's The View's "Best Donald Trump" competition. John's non-Trump appearances include the CBS series True Detective, "Labor Day" for PBS, and the hit HBO series, The Sopranos, where he played Howie Reinstein.

In 2016 during Trump's candidacy for President of the United States, Di Domenico's celebrity surged with media appearances and coverage with news media outlets worldwide all over the globe. In 2017, Di Domenico's accolades continued when he was nominated for an Emmy Award for a commercial work in which he utilized six different characters, including Dr. Evil and his highly-praised Austin Powers, for a television commercial in the Boston market.

During his career, he has impersonated celebrities including Dr. Phil, Guy Fieri, Jay Leno and Mike Myers.

Trump Impersonation
He began his Donald Trump impression in 2004 when asked if he could do a voice-over of "The Donald" for The Apprentice type game. Di Domenico has closely studied Trump's vocal and physical changes over the years to adapt his own impersonation, spending for Donald Trump wigs and creating personalized make-up and wardrobe to capture the essence of Trump. He has appeared as Donald Trump on Fox & Friends (Fox News) in 2006 and has appeared multiple times since then.  In January 2021, Di Domenico began acting in a YouTube webisode series, Orange Acres, where he and actress Mikalah Gordon portray Donald and Melania Trump as they navigate the post-Presidency life, searching for jobs and attempting to get out of crippling debt.

Credits

Movies

Television

Awards
His appearance on ABC's The View helped him the win for "Best Trump" impersonation which made him a finalist in the L.A. Laugh Factory's International Trump Impersonation contest, for which he took top spot.

References

External links

 

Male actors from Philadelphia
Living people
1962 births
Parodies of Donald Trump